James Giddings (fl. 1850s) was a Democratic member of the Wisconsin State Senate during the 1850 and 1851 sessions. Giddings represented the 10th District. His address was listed as being in Chester, Wisconsin.

References

External links
The Political Graveyard

Democratic Party Wisconsin state senators
Year of birth missing
Year of death missing
People from Dodge County, Wisconsin